The Agency Workers Regulations 2010 (SI 2010/93) are a statutory instrument forming part of United Kingdom labour law. They aim to combat discrimination against people who work for employment agencies, by stating that agency workers should be no less favourably treated in pay and working time than their full-time counterparts who undertake the same work. It gives effect in UK law to the European Union's Temporary and Agency Workers Directive.

Background

The AWD 2010 was the culmination of a succession of attempts to get rights for agency workers. A previous proposal, the Temporary and Agency Workers (Equal Treatment) Bill 2008, was introduced in the British parliament, designed to secure equal pay and terms for working time between vulnerable agency workers and their permanent staff counterparts. It has now been superseded (though is in all material respects identical) by the Temporary and Agency Workers Directive (2008/104/EC), which the UK was required to implement by December 2011 at the latest.

It was introduced by a private member, Labour backbencher Andrew Miller MP and would have formed an important part of the United Kingdom agency worker law, and an addition to the growing categories of employment discrimination law in the UK. The Bill's substance is modelled on a proposed European Directive, which has been blocked by the UK government since 2002. However the government has recently indicated that it will introduce a modified version of the Bill, through a statutory instrument under the European Communities Act 1972 to implement the TAW Directive, with a 12-week (3-month) waiting period before agency workers will get equal pay and working time conditions.

The bill has been supported by a majority of the Labour Party, and trade unions, and vigorously opposed by the Conservative Party and the CBI. The calls for legislation have been bolstered by the particularly vulnerable position of people who work for agencies. They lack almost all of the rights guaranteed for normal workers from the Employment Rights Act 1996. However the legislation does not seek to make any but minor alterations for the position of agency workers on this front.

The Bill is modelled, more or less directly, on the proposals put forward by the European Commission for a draft Temporary Agency Worker Directive (COD 2002/0149). This proposal was itself shelved, because of the UK government's consistent opposition to agency regulation, in the interests of labour market flexibility. According to newspaper reports, the UK got the backing of Germany to torpedo the draft Directive in return for the UK to help sink the Takeover Directive (Germany has comprehensive agency work regulation under its Arbeitnehmerüberlassungsgesetz and its Civil Code, esp §622, and the UK has strong Takeover Regulation, especially Rule 21 of the City Code). The significant difference between the proposed Directive and the Bill is that the former UK government managed to insert a 6-week qualification period in the Directive before the equal treatment rights click in (Art. 5(4)). The Bill has no proposed qualification period, though voices in the City have been calling for this to be one year. The latest reports suggest a 12-week qualifying period has been agreed between the private MP backers and the government, meaning a significant step back from the protection the Directive would offer. The Directive included equal treatment only pay, hours, parental rights and anti-discrimination (Art. 3(1)(d)). A significant omission therefore was any regulation on reasonable notice before dismissal (in the UK, ERA s.86; Germany has this for all workers already, regardless of their agency status, §622 BGB).

Before the 2005 United Kingdom general election, the trade unions and the government made the so-called Warwick Agreement (after its signing place, the University of Warwick). This included a promise on the government's part to reverse its opposition to the European Directive. But by 2007, the government was yet to deliver, and Paul Farrelly MP introduced the Temporary and Agency Workers (Prevention of Less Favourable Treatment) Bill. It mirrored the Directive in all respects, save that there would be no 6-week qualifying period. In that period's climate, the Bill did not gain enough attention and was talked out of time. In the Court of Appeal case James v. Greenwich LBC which further entrenched the subordinate position of agency workers, Mummery LJ pronounced it "doomed to failure for lack of support from the Government". But no sooner as that had been said, almost exactly the same Bill was reintroduced by Andrew Miller MP, with a small title change to emphasise "Equal Treatment" rather than "Prevention of Less Favourable Treatment". Identical in every way, save a tighter definition of employment agency and more provision for regulatory enforcement, it won the support of almost the whole Labour bench in the House of Commons. It was being heard in Committee each Wednesday morning as from 7 May. As of 21 May, the government has signalled that it will allow something similar to the Bill, but not the Bill itself, to be passed. It will incorporate a 12-week waiting period before the right to equal pay and time off begins, or 6 weeks less protection than the original 2002 Directive.

Scope
The Agency Workers Regulations aim to give effect to the Temporary and Agency Workers Directive in UK law. They require employers to treat agency workers and permanent staff equally in their contract terms on:

Hours and holiday time
Pay, including sick pay
Time off for parenting (for women only)
Discrimination law (though this is unnecessary because agency workers are already explicitly covered by the Equality Act 2010.)

See also

United Kingdom labour law
United Kingdom agency worker law
Employment Agencies Act 1973
Gangmasters (Licensing) Act 2004
Employment Agency Standards Inspectorate

Notes

References
N Countouris, 'The Temporary Agency Work Directive: Another Broken Promise?' [2009] 38(3) ILJ 329
E McGaughey, 'Should Agency Workers be Treated Differently?' (2010) SSRN

External links
First draft directive on Agency workers COD 2002/0149
Directive 97/81/EC on Part-time workers
Implemented under Part-time Workers (Prevention of Less Favourable Treatment) Regulations 2000, SI 2000/1551
Directive 99/70/EC on Fixed term workers
Implemented under Fixed Term Employees (Prevention of Less Favourable Treatment) Regulations 2002, SI 2002/2034
Powerpoint presentation on the state of the EU market from the European Confederation of Private Recruitment Agencies.
Directive 91/383/EEC of 25 June 1991 supplementing the measures to encourage improvements in the safety and health at work of workers with a fixed- duration employment relationship or a temporary employment relationship.

Anti-discrimination law in the United Kingdom
United Kingdom labour law
Employment compensation
Statutory Instruments of the United Kingdom
2010 in British law
Employment agencies of the United Kingdom
Public employment service
2010 in labor relations